The Vlaamse Reus (literal translation: Flemish Giant) is an award given to the best Flemish sportsperson of the year. The award is given on a yearly basis at the end of the year by the Flemish sports journalists.
The award itself is a sculpture created by Willem Vermandere.

Sabine Appelmans was the first person to win the prize. Three athletes won the prize three times: Luc Van Lierde, Kim Gevaert en Kim Clijsters.

Winners

Statistics 
 Won the award 3 times - Luc Van Lierde (1996, 1997 and 1999), Kim Clijsters (2000, 2001 and 2010), Kim Gevaert (2002, 2004 and 2007)
 Won the award 2 times - Frédérik Deburghgraeve (1994 and 1998), Tia Hellebaut (2006 and 2008), Nina Derwael (2017 and 2018)

References

Belgian sports trophies and awards